Aleksandar Bakić (born 3 September 2000) is a Montenegrin handball player for RK Nexe and the Montenegrin national team.

He represented Montenegro at the 2020 European Men's Handball Championship.

References

External links

2000 births
Living people
Montenegrin male handball players
People from Berane
Mediterranean Games competitors for Montenegro
Competitors at the 2018 Mediterranean Games